The Polyester Embassy is the only album by Australian band Madison Avenue, released in Australia on 2 October 2000 by Vicious Grooves.

Background
Before joining Madison Avenue, Cheyne Coates was working as a choreographer and singer in Melbourne. Coates met producer and writer Andy Van Dorsselaer (aka Andy Van) in a dance club. Van was the founder of the Vicious Vinyl record label and had remix credits for Tina Arena and CDB. Van Dorsselaer had won an ARIA Award for his production work on "Coma" by Pendulum.

The duo started working together mainly as writers and producers in 1998. Madison Avenue recorded their first song, "Fly", featuring Kellie Wolfgram as the vocalist. However, Coates sang on the group's breakthrough single "Don't Call Me Baby", as Van Dorsselaer preferred her version, even though the song was initially used as the guide track for Wolfgram.

The duo continued to work on their debut album through 2000, which was eventually released on 2 October 2000, eleven months after "Don't Call Me Baby". Coates spoke out about her time in the band and the process of making The Polyester Embassy, as well as their unreleased second album, after the band's split in 2003, saying that the duo was poorly organised and late in delivering material, blaming it on them being quickly thrust into the spotlight after the success of "Don't Call Me Baby". "I think the problem was that no one was in control, it was just a mess. We were always on the back foot, we were always late in delivering everything. When it's your first time around, you don't have a clue. But it was a good learning curve. We didn't even have a manager in the beginning so we were dealing with record companies ourselves, which is a bad idea."

Singles
 "Don't Call Me Baby" was released on 18 October 1999. It quickly rose to number 2 in the Australian charts, where it remained for six non-consecutive weeks, held off the top spot by "Blue (Da Ba Dee)" by Eiffel 65. It was eventually certified 3× Platinum. The song was also a success internationally, in the UK it debuted at number 1 and was certified Silver, and was performed on Top of the Pops. In the US, the song reached number 88 on the Billboard Hot 100, and number 1 on the Billboard Dance Club Songs chart.
 "Who the Hell Are You" was released on 5 June 2000 as the second single. It debuted atop the singles chart in Australia, where it stayed for two consecutive weeks, and was certified Platinum. Internationally, the song failed to match the success of "Don't Call Me Baby"; in the UK the song debuted and peaked at number 10 and remained in the top 40 for 3 weeks, and in the US the song reached number on the Billboard Hot Dance Club Songs, but failed to appear on the Hot 100.
 "Everything You Need" was released as the third single on 18 September 2000. It peaked at number 6 in Australia where it was certified Gold. In the UK, the song peaked at number 33.

A fourth single was released by the band, a cover of "Reminiscing", originally by Little River Band. The song was included only on the Japanese edition of the album, therefore elsewhere it was a single-only release. In Australia, the song was released on 5 March 2001 and continued the band's top 10 streak, peaking at number 9 and achieving Gold certification.

Critical reception

Tim Sheridan from AllMusic gave the album a negative review, saying "While it offers some decent dance grooves, this slick production does little more than rehash disco clichés without the sense of fun applied by bands like Deee-lite. Perhaps if the duo of Cheyne Coates and Andy Van didn't take itself so seriously, the project might not seem quite so empty." He highlighted "Who the Hell Are You" as an album pick.

Commercial performance
The Polyester Embassy was a success in the band's native Australia, peaking at number 4 and was certified Platinum. However, the album failed to match its success internationally, peaking at number 74 on the UK Albums Chart, and number 63 on the Japanese Albums Chart.

Track listing

Notes
 The North American edition of the album omits "What Can I Do" and the original mix of "Everything You Need", while the Mobin Master 12" Remix of the latter is moved up to track 6 in place of the original.

Charts

Certifications

References

2000 debut albums
Madison Avenue (band) albums